Gile State Forest is a state forest of New Hampshire located mostly in Springfield. It includes Gardner Memorial Wayside Park at the portion of the forest's edge that extends into Wilmot, which features a memorial to Walter C. Gardner II, whose father established Gile State Forest. 

An easy half-mile trail leads from Gardner Memorial Wayside Park to scenic Butterfield Pond.

References

New Hampshire state forests
Protected areas of Sullivan County, New Hampshire
Springfield, New Hampshire
Protected areas of Merrimack County, New Hampshire